The League of Communists of Slovenia (ZKS) was the Slovenian branch of the League of Communists of Yugoslavia, the sole legal party of Yugoslavia from 1945 to 1989. It was established in April 1937 as the Communist Party of Slovenia, as the first autonomous sub-national branch of the Yugoslav Communist Party. Its initial autonomy was further amplified with the Yugoslav constitution of 1974, which devolved greater power to the various republic level branches.

History
In 1989 Slovenia passed amendments to its constitution that asserted its sovereignty over the federation, its right to secede and set foundations to a multi-party system. These amendments were bitterly opposed by the leadership of Serbia under Slobodan Milošević. On 23 January 1990, the Slovene delegation, headed by Milan Kučan, left the Party Congress of the League of Communists of Yugoslavia, leading to the collapse of the all-Yugoslav party.

On 4 February 1990 the League of Communists of Slovenia changed its name to the League of Communists of Slovenia-Party of Democratic Reform (Zveza komunistov Slovenije-Stranka demokratične prenove - ZKS-SDP), and shortly afterwards began negotiations with the Democratic Opposition of Slovenia for the establishment of a multi-party system. In April 1990, the reformed Communists lost the elections to the DEMOS coalition. In 1992, they ceased to be the largest left wing party and entered a period of radical transformation, which gained momentum with the election of Borut Pahor as the party chairman. The same year, the party was renamed to Social Democratic Renewal (Socialdemokratska prenova).  On 29 May 1993 they merged with several other left-wing parties into United List of Social Democrats (ZLSD), later renamed to Social Democrats (SD).

Party leaders

Franc Leskošek (1937–1945) (1897–1983)
Boris Kidrič (1945–1946) (1912–1953)
Miha Marinko (1946–1966) (1900–1983)
Albert Jakopič (October 1966– December 1968) (1914–1996)
Franc Popit (December 1968 – April 1982) (1921–2013)
Andrej Marinc (April 1982 – May 1986) (born 1930)
Milan Kučan (May 1986 – December 1989) (born 1941)
Ciril Ribičič (December 1989 – May 1990) (born 1947)

Other influential leaders
Edvard Kardelj (1910–1979)
Tone Tomšič  (1910–1942)
Vida Tomšič  (1913–1998)
Boris Kraigher (1914–1967)
Lidija Šentjurc (1911–2000)
Ivan Maček (1908–1993)
Sergej Kraigher (1914–2001)
Boris Ziherl (1910–1976)
Stane Dolanc (1925–1999)
Mitja Ribičič (1919–2013)
Prežihov Voranc (1893–1950)
Dragotin Gustinčič (1882–1974)
Stane Kavčič (1919–1987)
Viktor Avbelj (1914–1993)
Vladimir Krivic (1914–1996)
Ivan Regent (1884–1967)
Jože Potrč (1903–1963)
Aleš Bebler (1907–1981)
Joža Vilfan (1908–1987)
Mirko Košir (1905–1951)
Angela Vode (1892–1985)
Dušan Kermavner (1903–1975)
France Klopčič (1903–1986)
Dušan Pirjevec (1921–1977)
Franc Šetinc (1929–2016)
Janez Vipotnik (1917–1998)
Vinko Hafner (1920–2015)
Jože Smole (1927–1996)

Electoral results

Presidential

National Assembly

See also
History of Slovenia
Timeline of Slovenian history
League of Communists of Yugoslavia
League of Communists of Bosnia and Herzegovina
League of Communists of Croatia
League of Communists of Macedonia
League of Communists of Montenegro
League of Communists of Serbia
League of Communists of Vojvodina
League of Communists of Kosovo
List of leaders of communist Yugoslavia
Socialist Federal Republic of Yugoslavia

References

1937 establishments in Slovenia
1990 disestablishments in Slovenia
Communist parties in Slovenia
Defunct communist parties
Defunct socialist parties in Europe
Defunct political parties in Slovenia
League of Communists of Yugoslavia
Organizations based in Ljubljana
Parties of one-party systems
Political history of Slovenia
Political parties disestablished in 1990
Political parties established in 1937